James Shannon Clift (March 5, 1814 – July 16, 1877) was a merchant and political figure in Newfoundland.

Clift was born in St. John's in 1814 to James and Flora Clift. His father was also a merchant. He operated a commission merchant and ship brokerage business in partnership with James B. Woods, his brother-in-law. He was district grand master for the Freemasons from 1871 to 1877. He was a member of the Legislative Council from 1861 to 1874 and served in the Executive Council from 1870 to 1874.

Clift died in St. John's in 1877.

References 

 

1814 births
1877 deaths
Members of the Legislative Council of Newfoundland
Newfoundland Colony people
Politicians from St. John's, Newfoundland and Labrador